NGPC may refer to:
 Nebraska Game and Parks Commission
 Neo Geo Pocket Color